Thomas Frederick Cockram (26 February 1890 – 22 October 1952) was an Australian rules footballer who played with Collingwood in the Victorian Football League (VFL).

Notes

External links 

Tommy Cockram's profile at Collingwood Forever

1890 births
1952 deaths
Australian rules footballers from Melbourne
Collingwood Football Club players
Australian military personnel of World War I
People from Brunswick, Victoria
Military personnel from Melbourne